Tashkent International School (TIS), an International Baccalaureate (IB) World School, is an independent, non-profit, coeducational day school from preschool through grade 12 located in Tashkent, the capital city of Uzbekistan in Central Asia.  TIS was founded in 1994 to provide quality education in English for children of the diplomatic corps, international corporations and local families.

History
Tashkent International School was founded in 1994 with the help of the United Nations and five diplomatic missions. These include the United States, France, United Kingdom of Great Britain and Northern Ireland, Federal Republic of Germany and Republic of Korea.  The School is operated under the governance of a parent-elected and board-appointed ten-member School Board with an additional member appointed from the U.S. Embassy. TIS is accredited by the Council of International Schools and the New England Association of Schools and Colleges. TIS is also a member of the Central and Eastern European Schools Association and is an authorized IB World School.

Mission statement
Tashkent International School educates students to be internationally minded, think creatively, reason critically and communicate effectively.

Faculty and Staff
In the 2016-2017 school year, TIS has 165 staff members including 61 full-time teachers, 5 part-time teachers, 2 intern teachers and 19 teaching assistants plus 6 full-time administrators.  Of the total, 32 teachers are U.S. citizens, 19 teachers and 19 teaching assistants are host-country nationals, and 33 teachers originate from 15 other countries including the UK, Canada, New Zealand, India, Korea, Belgium, France and Poland.

Curriculum
The School offers the full IB curriculum: the Primary Years Program (PYP) for students in preschool through grade 5; the Middle Years Program (MYP) for students in grades 6 through 10; and the Diploma Program for grades 11 and 12. Instruction is in English and takes advantage of small class sizes and the diverse educational backgrounds of the students. Courses include English, mathematics, science, individuals and societies, physical and health education, performing and visual arts, design and foreign languages. English as a second language is also provided to grades 2 through 10. Russian is offered as a foreign language and to native speakers in grades 2 through 12. French is also offered in the secondary school. The School's programs and its graduates are recognized to meet the highest standards of international education.

TIS is the only International Baccalaureate school in Uzbekistan.

Sports Teams
TIS has a Basketball and Football team that every year goes to championships. Their sports teams program is considered to be one of the best international school sports program in Central Asia, winning plenty of domestic and international tournaments throughout their history.

Student life
TIS offers a comprehensive after-school activities program for all students which supports the IB Diploma CAS program including Model United Nations, service learning, student council, yearbook, instrumental music training, academic games, bands/choir, art, and athletics such as soccer, basketball, volleyball, cross country and track and field.

There are many student councils: Student Council (for Elementary, Middle and High school), Catering Council, Co-Curricular Council and Digital Council. TIS is a full member of CEESA (Central and Eastern European Schools Association), a student activities and athletics conference.  Students frequently travel to other CEESA schools to participate and compete in a variety of events.

TIS is a founding member of the Central Asia Federation of Activities, Athletics and Art (CAFA), a regional conference including schools in Kazakhstan and Kyrgyzstan.  Students participate in the annual Central Asia Soccer Classic (CASC) and Central Asia Basketball Classic (CABC), hosted by CAFA member schools.

Facilities
The TIS campus consists of a 3-story main building, a 3-story elementary building, an art and design building, a separate purpose-built facility for preschool, a gym, and a 2-story building for languages and counseling.  Construction of an additional gym began October 2016 and will be complete June 2017. The campus is located on 13 wooded acres 10 minutes from the center of Tashkent. The facilities include 64 well-equipped classrooms, 17 offices, 2 libraries, 4 fully equipped science labs, a full-size gymnasium, an indoor theater, a multi-purpose room, prep rooms, 4 computer labs, 2 music rooms, and 3 art rooms. There are computers in the classrooms and libraries for student use, including 42 Macintosh computers plus a 1-to-1 iPad program for grades 4-8, a 1-to-1 laptop program for grades 9 and 10 and an additional 30 iPads for kindergarten to grade 3. The entire campus has high-speed wireless Internet. Sports facilities include basketball/volleyball courts, a large and small soccer field, field spaces for baseball/softball, as well as general recreation areas and wooded, landscaped grounds and an 18-hole disc golf course. The TIS campus is a closed campus, surrounded by a 3.5-meter wall with 24-hour security and full CCTV coverage of the grounds and gates.

References

External links

 School website

Educational institutions established in 1994
International Baccalaureate schools
Schools in Uzbekistan
International School
International School
1994 establishments in Uzbekistan